Major Hugh James Wyld T.D. (16 April 1880 – 9 December 1961) was an English cricketer.  Wyld was a right-handed batsman who bowled slow left-arm orthodox.  He was born in Kensington, London and educated at Harrow School and Magdalen College, Oxford, while later in his life he became an officer in the British Army.

Cricket career
Wyld played a single Minor Counties Championship match for Buckinghamshire against Berkshire in 1899. In 1900, he made his first-class debut for Oxford University against Sussex.  In that same season he also made his debut for the Marylebone Cricket Club against London County, and for Middlesex against Leicestershire in the County Championship. He played for Middlesex until the 1901 season, having made five first-class appearances for the county. It was for Oxford University that he made the majority of his first-class appearances for, playing for the university 27 times from 1900 to 1903. In his 27 first-class matches for the university, he scored 908 runs at an average of 20.17, with a high score of 85. This score, which was one of four fifties he made, came against HDG Leveson-Gower's XI in 1902. He also made three first-class appearances for the Marylebone Cricket Club and a single appearance for the Gentlemen of England.

Military career
Wyld was commissioned as a 2nd Lieutenant in the Hertfordshire Yeomanry on 4 March 1903. By 17 July 1908 he was a Lieutenant in the Yeomanry, having been granted that rank on 20 December 1905, while by 1909 promoted to Captain on 1 October of that year. On 25 August 1913, Wyld was promoted to Major and was still serving in the Hertfordshire Yeomanry at this time. By 1919, Wyld was still serving in the army with the Yeomanry, having taken up a temporary position within the Territorial Force in April 1919. He left the army after resigning his commission on 22 September 1922.  He retained the rank of Major and held the Territorial Decoration for over twelve years service.

Personal life
Wyld's daughter, Barbara, married David Hely-Hutchinson, the son of Richard Hely-Hutchinson, 6th Earl of Donoughmore on 7 June 1934.  The couple had five children. Another daughter, Diana, married the cricketer Wilfred Hill-Wood on 30 April 1947. Wyld lived for part of his life at Beverstone Old Rectory, it was in the Gloucestershire village of Beverstone that he died on 9 December 1961.

References

External links
Hugh Wyld at ESPNcricinfo
Hugh Wyld at CricketArchive

1880 births
1961 deaths
Sportspeople from Kensington
People educated at Harrow School
Alumni of Magdalen College, Oxford
English cricketers
Buckinghamshire cricketers
Marylebone Cricket Club cricketers
Middlesex cricketers
Oxford University cricketers
Hertfordshire Yeomanry officers
British Army personnel of World War I
Gentlemen of England cricketers